Raymundo "Ray" Barretto Pagán (April 29, 1929 – February 17, 2006) was an American percussionist and bandleader of Puerto Rican descent. Throughout his career as a percussionist, he played a wide variety of Latin music styles, as well as Latin jazz. His first hit, "El Watusi," was recorded by his Charanga Moderna in 1962, becoming the most successful pachanga song in the United States. In the late 1960s, Barretto became one of the leading exponents of boogaloo and what would later be known as salsa. Nonetheless, many of Barretto's recordings would remain rooted in more traditional genres such as son cubano. A master of the descarga (improvised jam session), Barretto was a long-time member of the Fania All-Stars. His success continued into the 1970s with songs such as "Cocinando" and "Indestructible." His last album for Fania Records, Soy dichoso, was released in 1990. He then formed the New World Spirit jazz ensemble and continued to tour and record until his death in 2006.

Life and career

Early years
Barretto was born on April 29, 1929, in New York City. His parents moved to New York from Puerto Rico in the early 1920s, looking for a better life. His father left their family when Barretto was four, and his mother Delores moved the family to the Bronx, and from a young age he was influenced by his mother's love of music and by the jazz of Duke Ellington and Count Basie.

In 1946, when Barretto was 17 years old, he joined the Army. While stationed in Germany, he met Belgian vibraphonist Fats Sadi. However, it was when he heard Dizzy Gillespie's  "Manteca" with Gil Fuller and Chano Pozo that he realized his calling.

Beginnings as a sideman
In 1949, when Barretto returned home from military service, he started to visit clubs and participated in jam sessions, where he perfected his conga playing. On one occasion Charlie Parker heard Barretto play and invited him to play in his band. Later, he was asked to play for José Curbelo and Tito Puente, for whom he played for four years. It was in 1958, while playing for Puente, that Barretto received his first recording credit. Barretto developed a unique style of playing the conga and soon he was sought by other jazz band leaders. Latin percussionists started to appear in jazz groups with frequency as a consequence of Barretto's musical influence.

Charanga Moderna and rise to fame
In 1960, Barretto was a house musician for the Prestige, Blue Note, and Riverside labels. He also recorded on Columbia Records with Jazz flautist Herbie Mann. New York had become the center of Latin music in the United States and a musical genre called pachanga was the Latin music craze of the early 1960s. In 1962, Barretto formed his first group, Charanga La Moderna, and recorded his first hit, "El Watusi" for Tico Records. He was quite successful with the song and the genre, to the point of being typecast (something that he disliked).

Boogaloo and early salsa
In 1965, Barretto signed with the Latin division of United Artists, UA Latino, and began recording a series of albums in the boogaloo genre, which merges rhythm and blues with Latin music. On his album El Ray Criollo, Barretto explored the modern Latin sounds of New York, combining features of charanga and conjunto to birth a new style which would later be known as salsa. After recording four albums for the United Artists label, Barretto joined the Fania record label in 1967, and his first recording for the new label was the 1968 album Acid, which is often cited as one of the most enduring boogaloo albums, with songs such as "A Deeper Shade of Soul" and the title track was included in the soundtrack of the video game Grand Theft Auto: Vice City Stories on the fictitious Latin music radio station "Radio Espantoso". During this period, Adalberto Santiago was the band's lead vocalist.

Success with Fania

In 1972 Barretto's Que viva la música was released. "Cocinando," a track from the album, opened the soundtrack of the Fania All Stars film Our Latin Thing in which Barretto had a role. After a number of successful albums, and just as his Afro-Cuban band had attained a remarkable following, most of its members left it to form Típica 73, a multinational salsa conglomerate. In 1973, Barretto recorded the album Indestructible, in which he played "La familia", a song written by José Curbelo in 1953 and recorded by the sonero Carlos Argentino with the Cuban band Sonora Matancera; Tito Allen joined as new vocalist.  Allen left the band after "Indestructible". The series of departures left Barretto depressed and disappointed with salsa; he then redirected his efforts to jazz, while remaining as musical director of the Fania All Stars. In 1975 he released Barretto, also referred to as the Guararé album, with new vocalists Ruben Blades and Tito Gomez.

Barretto played the conga in recording sessions for the Rolling Stones and the Bee Gees. In 1975, he was nominated for a Grammy Award for the album "Barretto". From 1976 to 1978, Barretto recorded three records for Atlantic Records, and was nominated for a Grammy for Barretto Live...Tomorrow. In 1979, he recorded La Cuna for CTI records and produced a salsa record for Fania, titled Rican/Struction, which was named 1980 "Best Album" by Latin N.Y. Magazine, with Barretto crowned as Conga Player of the Year.

New World Spirit

In 1990, Barretto won his first Grammy for the album Ritmo en el corazón ("Rhythm in the Heart"), which featured the vocals of Celia Cruz. His 1968 song "A Deeper Shade Of Soul" was sampled for the 1991 Billboard Hot 100 #21 hit "Deeper Shade of Soul" by Dutch band Urban Dance Squad.

Also in the 1990s, a Latin agent, Chino Rodríguez, approached Barretto with a concept he also pitched to Larry Harlow. The idea was "The Latin Legends of Fania", and Barretto, Harlow, Yomo Toro, Pete "el Conde" Rodríguez, Junior González, Ismael Miranda, and Adalberto Santiago came together and formed "The Latin Legends of Fania", booked by Chino Rodríguez of Latin Music Booking.com. However, in 1992 Barretto left the Legends to focus on his new jazz ensemble, New World Spirits, with which he recorded several albums for the Concord Jazz label.

In 1999, Barretto was inducted into the International Latin Music Hall of Fame.

In 2006, the National Endowment for the Arts awarded Barretto its Jazz Masters Award.

Barretto lived in New York and was an active musical producer, as well as the leader of a touring band which embarked on tours of the United States, Africa, Europe, Israel and Latin America.

Death
A resident of Norwood, New Jersey, Barretto died of heart failure and complications of multiple health issues on February 17, 2006, at Hackensack University Medical Center in New Jersey. His body was flown to Puerto Rico, where Barretto was given formal honors by the Institute of Puerto Rican Culture; his remains were cremated.

Discography

As leader

 Barretto para bailar (Riverside, 1961)
 Latino! (Riverside, 1962)
 Charanga Moderna (Tico, 1962)
 Moderna de Siempre (Tico, 1963)
 On Fire Again (Encendido otra vez) (Tico, 1963)
 The Big Hits Latin Style (Tico, 1963)
 Guajira y guaguancó (Tico, 1964)
 Viva Watusi! (United Artists, 1965)
 Señor 007 (United Artists, 1966)
 El Ray Criollo (United Artists, 1966)
 Latino con Soul (United Artists, 1966)
 Fiesta En El Barrio (United Artists, 1967)
 Acid (Fania, 1968)
 Hard Hands (Fania, 1968)
 Together (Fania, 1969)
 Head Sounds (Fania, 1969)
 Barretto Power (Fania, 1970)
 The Message (Fania, 1971)
 From the Beginning (Fania, 1971)
 Que viva la música (Fania, 1972)
 Indestructible (Fania, 1973)
 The Other Road (Fania, 1973)
 Barretto (Fania, 1975)
 Tomorrow: Barretto Live (Atlantic, 1976)
 Energy to Burn (Fania, 1977)
 Eye of the Beholder (Atlantic, 1977)
 Can You Feel It? (Atlantic, 1978)
 Gracias (Fania, 1978)
 La Cuna (CTI Records, 1979)
 Rican/Struction (Fania, 1979)
 Giant Force (Fania, 1980)
 Rhythm of Life (Fania, 1982)
 Todo se va poder (Fania, 1984)
 Aquí se puede (Fania, 1987)
 Irresistible (Fania, 1989)
 Ritmo en el Corazón (Fania, 1990)
 Handprints (Concord Picante, 1991)
 Soy Dichoso (Fania, 1992)
 Live in New York (Messidor, 1992)
 Salsa Caliente de Nu York (Universe, 2001)
 Fuerza Gigante: Live in Puerto Rico April 27, 2001 (Universe, 2004)
 Standards Rican-ditioned (Zoho Music, 2006)

With New World Spirit
 Ancestral Messages (Concord Picante, 1992)
 Taboo (Concord Picante, 1994)
 My Summertime (Owl, 1995)
 Contact! (Blue Note, 1998)
 Portraits in Jazz and Clave (RCA, 2000)
 Trancedance (Circular Moves, 2001)
 Homage to Art Blakey and The Jazz Messengers (Sunnyside, 2003)
 Hot Hands (Concord Picante, 2003)
 Time Was - Time Is (O+ Music, 2005)

As sideman 
With Gene Ammons
 Blue Gene (Prestige, 1958)
 Boss Tenor (Prestige, 1960)
 Up Tight! (Prestige, 1961)
 Boss Soul! (Prestige, 1961)
 Twisting the Jug with Joe Newman and Jack McDuff (Prestige, 1961)
 Soul Summit Vol. 2 (Prestige, 1962) – rec. 1961
 Late Hour Special (Prestige, 1964) – rec. 1961
 Velvet Soul (Prestige, 1964) – rec. 1961
 Goodbye (Prestige, 1974)

With Kenny Burrell
 Bluesy Burrell with Coleman Hawkins (Moodsville, 1962)
 Midnight Blue (Blue Note, 1963)
 Crash! with Brother Jack McDuff (Prestige, 1963)
 Soul Call (Prestige, 1964)
 God Bless the Child (CTI, 1971)

With Celia Cruz
 Tremendo Trío! (Fania, 1983)
 Ritmo en el Corazón (Fania, 1989)

With Eddie "Lockjaw" Davis
 Bacalao with Shirley Scott (Prestige, 1959)
 Afro-Jaws (Riverside, 1960)
 Misty with Shirley Scott  (Moodsville, 1963) – rec. 1960
 Lock, the Fox (RCA Victor, 1966)

With Lou Donaldson
 Swing and Soul (Blue Note, 1957)
 Blues Walk (Blue Note, 1958)
 Light-Foot (Blue Note, 1959)
 The Time Is Right (Blue Note, 1959)
 Midnight Sun (Blue Note, 1960)
 Cole Slaw (Blue Note, 1964)

With Jimmy Forrest
 Most Much! (Prestige, 1961)
 Soul Street (New Jazz, 1962)

With Eddie Harris
 Mean Greens (Atlantic, 1966)
 The Electrifying Eddie Harris (Atlantic, 1967)

With Yusef Lateef
 Yusef Lateef's Detroit (Atlantic, 1969)
 In a Temple Garden (CTI, 1979)

With Johnny Lytle
 Moon Child (Jazzland, 1962)
 The Soulful Rebel (Milestone, 1971)

With Herbie Mann
 Flute, Brass, Vibes and Percussion (Verve, 1959)
 The Common Ground (Atlantic, 1960)
 The Family of Mann (Atlantic, 1961)
 Herbie Mann Returns to the Village Gate (Atlantic, 1963) – rec. 1961
 Our Mann Flute (Atlantic, 1966)
 The Herbie Mann String Album (Atlantic, 1967)
 Glory of Love (A&M/CTI, 1967)
 Discothèque (Atlantic, 1975)
 Waterbed (Atlantic, 1975)

With Johnny "Hammond" Smith
 Talk That Talk (New Jazz, 1960)
 Open House! (Riverside, 1963)

With Sonny Stitt
 Stitt Meets Brother Jack with Jack McDuff (Prestige, 1962)
 The Matadors Meet the Bull (Roulette, 1965)

With Cal Tjader
 Along Comes Cal (Verve, 1967)
 Hip Vibrations (Verve, 1967)

With others
 Bee Gees, Main Course (RSO, 1975)
 Ray Bryant, Dancing the Big Twist (Columbia, 1961)
 Arnett Cobb, Party Time (Prestige, 1959)
 Billy Cobham, Spectrum (Atlantic, 1973)
 George Benson, The Other Side of Abbey Road (A&M, 1970)
 Deodato, Prelude (CTI, 1972)
 Bill Doggett,Doggett Beat for Dancing Feet (King, 1957)
 Judy Collins, True Stories and Other Dreams (Elektra Records, 1973)
 Art Farmer, Listen to Art Farmer and the Orchestra (Mercury, 1963) – rec. 1962
 The Red Garland Trio, Manteca (Prestige, 1958)
 Ben E. King, Spanish Harlem (Atco, 1961)
 Dizzy Gillespie, Carnegie Hall Concert (Verve, 1961) – live
 Al Grey, The Al Grey - Billy Mitchell Sextet with Billy Mitchell (Argo, 1962) – live rec. 1961
 Slide Hampton, Jazz with a Twist (Atlantic, 1962)
 Jake Holmes, How Much Time (Columbia, 1972)
 Willis Jackson, Thunderbird (Prestige, 1962)
 Clifford Jordan, Soul Fountain (Vortex, 1966 [1970])
 Junior Mance, I Believe to My Soul (Atlantic, 1968)
 Jack McDuff, Somethin' Slick! (Prestige, 1963)
 Wes Montgomery, SO Much Guitar! (Riverside, 1961)
 Crosby, Stills & Nash, CSN (Atlantic, 1977)
 Oliver Nelson, Impressions of Phaedra (United Artists, 1962)
 Dave Pike, Limbo Carnival (New Jazz, 1962)
 Michel Sardaby, Michel Sardaby in New York (Sound Hills, 2002)
 Jeremy Steig and Eddie Gómez, Rain Forest (CMP, 1980)
 Julius Watkins, French Horns for My Lady (Philips, 1962)
 Weather Report, Mysterious Traveller (Columbia, 1974)
 Frank Wess, Southern Comfort (Prestige, 1962)
 Charles Williams, Stickball (Mainstream, 1972)

See also
 Salsa
 Charanga_(Cuba)
 Afro-Cuban jazz
 List of Puerto Ricans

References

External links

 Ray Barretto Discography at Discogs
 Ray Barretto at IMDb
 Photographs and sound

1929 births
2006 deaths
20th-century American drummers
20th-century American male musicians
American male drummers
American jazz drummers
American salsa musicians
American people of Puerto Rican descent
American male jazz musicians
Atlantic Records artists
Avant-garde jazz musicians
Conga players
CTI Records artists
Cuban charanga musicians
Grammy Award winners
Fania Records artists
Jazz fusion musicians
Jazz musicians from New York (state)
Jazz percussionists
Musicians from New York City
Puerto Rican jazz musicians
Puerto Rican Army personnel
The Blackout All-Stars members
Tico Records artists
United States Army soldiers
People from East Harlem
People from Norwood, New Jersey
Zoho Music artists